Brian O'Driscoll (born 10 April 1994) is an Irish Gaelic footballer who plays as a right wing-back for the Cork senior team.

Born in Caheragh, County Cork, O'Driscoll first arrived on the inter-county scene at the age of sixteen when he first linked up with the Cork minor team, before later joining the under-21 side. He made his senior debut during the 2014 National Football League. Since then O'Driscoll has become a regular member of the starting fifteen.

At club level O'Driscoll plays with Tadhg Mac Cárthaigh's.

O'Driscoll's brothers, Colm and Kevin, as well as his father, Gene, have all played for Cork.

Honours

Team

University College Cork
Sigerson Cup (1): 2014

Cork
Munster Under-21 Football Championship (3): 2012, 2013, 2014

References

1994 births
Living people
Tadhg Mac Cárthaigh's Gaelic footballers
UCC Gaelic footballers
Cork inter-county Gaelic footballers